Edward Johnson Bellerby LRAM (28 March 1858 – 2 April 1940) was an English organist, composer and teacher.

Biography

He was born on 28 March 1858 in Pickering, Yorkshire. He studied organ under Edwin George Monk of York Minster, 1876–80, and was assistant organist for most of that time.

He graduated from New College, Oxford Mus. Bac in 1879 and Mus. Doc in 1895.

He was the father of Olympic athlete Alfred Bellerby.

Appointments

Assistant Organist at York Minster ca.1876 - 1880
Organist to John Hotham, 5th Baron Hotham 1877 – 1878
Organist of Selby Abbey 1878 – 1881
Organist at St. John the Baptist, Margate, 1881 - 1884
Organist of Holy Trinity Church Margate 1884 - 1917

Compositions

He composed two hymn tunes, Lagos and Margate, and a number of choral and orchestral pieces.

References

1858 births
1940 deaths
English organists
British male organists
Alumni of New College, Oxford